The National Congress of the Lao People's Revolutionary Party (LPRP) is the party's highest decision-making body. The LPRP has convened 11 congresses since its foundation in 1955, and eight since taking power in 1975. According to the party rules, the party congress is to be convened by the LPRP Central Committee (CC) every fifth year. It functions as a forum that approves party policy (such as the five-year plans), is empowered to amend the party's charter and program, and elects the Central Committee. The party leadership, through the Political Report of the Central Committee, briefs the party on its work in the period since its last congress, and sets out future goals for the period in between the next congress.

The congress was always convened in March from the 5th Congress in 1991 to the 9th Congress in 2011. According to Martin Sturt-Fox, this suggests an ideological cohesion within the party and its leadership. The 4th Congress introduced the "New Economic Mechanism" (NEM, market reforms). Partly for introducing NEM, the 4th Congress is the last congress to be postponed due to political infighting. Due to the party's secret nature, it's hard to discern the work and the political intrigues which takes place before the congress. In the run-up to party congresses, outside observers try to discern factional intrigues, usually between two supposedly "pro-Chinese" and "pro-Vietnamese" or "pro-reform" and "anti-reform" camps. Despite this, there seems to be broad agreement within the party on the path its pursuing: that is, creating a socialist market economic model and attracting foreign direct investment.

Keys

Convocations

See also 

 Socialist market economy
 Socialist-oriented market economy

References

General
Information on congresses, number of delegates, number of people elected to CCs, party membership, the individual who presented the Political Report and information on when the congress was convened can be found in these sources:

Bibliography
Articles and journals:

Specific

Congresses of the Lao People's Revolutionary Party
Laos, People's Revolutionary Party